Paliouri (Greek: Παλιούρι) may refer to the following settlements in Greece:

Paliouri, Chalkidiki, a village in Chalkidiki 
Paliouri, Evros, a village in the municipality Didymoteicho, Evros regional unit
Paliouri, Karditsa, a village in the municipal unit Kallifono, Karditsa regional unit
Paliouri, Magnesia, a village in the municipal unit Aisonia, Magnesia 
Paliouri, Phthiotis, a village in the municipality Makrakomi, Phthiotis